Kelvinator was an Italian professional cycling team that existed only in 1968. The team was sponsored by Kelvinator, an American home appliance company and competed in the 1968 Giro d'Italia.

Major wins
1968
 GP Vaux, Vincent Denson
 Giro del Belvedere, Lucillo Lievore

References

Defunct cycling teams based in Italy
1968 establishments in Italy
1968 disestablishments in Italy
Cycling teams established in 1968
Cycling teams disestablished in 1968